The West Kerry Senior Football Championship is a Gaelic football competition between clubs affiliated to the West Kerry division of the Gaelic Athletic Association.

An Ghaeltacht , Abha Na Scáil , Caisleán Ghriare , Daingean Uí Chúis & Lios Póil are the five teams.

2022 Championship 
West Kerry Senior Football Championship 2021 was won by Dingle to complete their fifth title in a row.

Quarter  Final

Lios Póil 0-08 Abha Na Scáil 1-12

Semi Final 

Caisléan Ghriaire 0-09 An Ghaeltacht 0-11Both teams faced tough weather conditions and It took both teams 10-15 minutes to begin to settle into this game,in Castlegregory this evening.

After 20 minutes, scores stood at 2 points to Castle, 3 points to An Ghaeltacht, with both teams defending well and working hard off the ball.

It was an evenly contested first half, Castle 0-3 to An Ghaeltacht's 0-6 at half time.

In the second half, Castle began to find the momentum and kicked two points in the first 10 minutes of the half.

Castle continued to push on in the second half with some excellent attacking, and defensive  moves.

In the end, Castle were narrowly edged out by 2 points, Castle 0-9 to An Ghaeltacht's 0-11.Semi FinalDaingean Ui Chuis 2-16 Abha Na Scáil 1-08FinalAn Ghaeltacht 0-6 Daingean Ui Chuis 0-09Dingle's trump card was in the shape of Tom O’Sullivan who may have been unfortunate in not picking up an All-Star this year but he was head and shoulders above everybody else as played as an extra forward with the wind in the opening half and then was back helping to keep An Ghaeltacht out late on.

Dingle had the wind the opening half and they kicked the opening six points, with Tom O’Sullivan four while Dylan Geaney and Darragh O’Sullivan kicked a point each. An Ghaeltacht were finding it hard to make any headway against the gale but they won two frees in the 25th and 26th minutes and Dara Ó Se converted both.

But Dingle added two more points from Tom O’Sullivan and Barry D O’Sullivan to lead 0-8 to 0-2 at the interval.

The rain disappeared and sun shone for the second half as the Three Sisters appeared but the wind never abated as Paul Geaney came on, and Dingle though adding one point in the second half from Tom O’ Sullivan in the 50th used all their experience and game management to curtail the home side. 

Three points in the third quarter is all that An Ghaeltacht could manage though, one each from Dara Ó Se, Pádraig Óg Ó Sé and An Ghaeltacht’s best player, Cian Ó Murchu.

Scorers for Dingle: Tom O’Sullivan (0-6, 4frees), D O’Sullivan, B O’Sullivan and D Geaney (0-1 each) 

Scorers for An Ghaeltacht: D Ó Sé (0-3frees), P J Mac Láimh, P Óg Ó Sé and C Ó Murchú (0-1 each) 

 2021 Championship 
West Kerry Senior Football Championship 2021 was won by Dingle to complete their four in a row of titles.Quarter Final Lios Póil 0-10 Caisléan Ghriaire 2-16A few new faces in the starting line up didn't upset the flow in Castlegregory play over in damp Lispole this afternoon.....Colm O Mahoney in at full forward raking up 1-04, Maurice O Connell with a goal and 3 points and the every industrious Brandon Hoare with a couple of well crafted scores. Cian O Grady, back in the starting 15, he too brought the scoring boots with 3 long range scores and points a piece for Anto Kelliher, Alan Fitz, Patrick O Donoghue and a fine point too for Mike Scanlon after a surging run from the half back line. Always in control Castlegregory GAA will be happy with this performance as build up to the semi final v An Ghaeltacht. Lios Póil were best served by Cathal O Sullivan at full forward, Matthew Grfffin and Gareth NoonanSemi Final 1 - Abha Na Scáil 0-05 Daingean Uí Chúis 1-15In the first semi-final, Dingle were comfortable winners against Annascaul in the Paddy Kennedy Memorial Park last Saturday.

A goal inside the opening five minutes for Paul Geaney set the town side on their way and from there they never really looked back.
Dingle led 1–10 to 0–3 at half-time with the rate of scoring slowing down for both sides in the second half, albeit that Dingle managed to extend their advantage by a further two points at the finish for a thirteen-point success.Semi Final 2 - Caisléan Ghriaire 1-06 An Ghaeltacht 2-04

The second semi-final was a much more competitive affair with  An Gaeltacht squeaking out a single point success on the road.

A first half goal for Castlegregory's Maurice O’Connell gave Castle a fighting chance and they carried a lead at the break 1–5 to 0–2.

Second half goals from Shane Ó Grifín and Pádraig Óigí Ó Sé helped turn the tide, however, and An Ghaeltacht advanced to the decider with their great rivals.

.
Final - Daingean Uí Chúis 2-12 An Ghaeltacht 0-05

Dingle secured their fourth West Kerry Championship in a row when they overpowered neighbours An Ghaeltacht at Páirc an Ághasaigh on Saturday afternoon.

The hosts started off on the front foot straight from throw-in, as Matthew Flaherty finished off a fine Dingle move, a point that set the tone for the opening exchanges.

The big reward for their industrious start in the trying conditions came in the fourth minute as Paul Geaney found the onrushing Darragh O’Sullivan who finished calmly to open up a five-point margin between the sides.

Éanna Ó Conchúir was working hard to get on the ball and opened up the Gaeltacht account nine minutes in, bringing the game to life, but that suited Dingle. They upped their game and the gulf in class became evident.

The free-flowing Dingle forwards combined well with points coming from Dylan and Conor Geaney before their cousin, Paul rose highest over Kerry teammate Brian Ó Beaglaoich to gather the ball before finding the bottom corner to give Dingle a 2–4 to 0–1 lead after 18 minutes.

Gaeltacht kept battling but the final ball often eluded them. Pádraig Óg Ó Sé popped up with a fine point from the half-back line but it was only a dent in the Dingle lead, leaving a nine-point gap at the interval.

It was more of the same after the break as Dingle had the majority of possession. Their freshly crowned All-Star Tom O’Sullivan saw little of the ball in the full-back line and that speaks volumes about this Dingle performance.

Daingean Uí Chúis: G Curran; P O’Connor, C L O’Sullivan, T O’Sullivan; M Flaherty, T L O’Sullivan, G Durrant; B O’Sullivan, D O’Sullivan; N Geaney, D Geaney, M Geaney; C Geaney, P Geaney, M Flannery

Subs: B Kelleher for D O’Sullivan (45’), T Sheehy for C Geaney (47’), T Browne for M Flannery (47’), B O’Connor for C L O’Sullivan (54’), J O’Sullivan for M Flaherty (54’).

AN GHAELTACHT: T Mac a tSaoir; F Ó Loinsigh, C Ó Beaglaoich, F Ó Cuanaigh; P Ó Sé, B Ó Beaglaoich, G Mac an tSaoir; C Ó Beaglaoich, C Ó Murchú, C Ó Muircheartaigh, S Ó Bambaire, C Ó Fionnachta, S Ó Grifín, É Ó Conchúir, Ó Ó Sé.

Subs: PJ Mac Láimh for C Ó Murchú (29’), C Ó Riagáin for Ó Bambaire (HT), S Ó Muircheartaigh for S Ó Grifín (HT), T Ó Sé for Ó Ó Sé (46’), N Mac Gearailt for G Mac a tSaoir (53’).

2021

Roll of honour

West Kerry Senior Football League 
The West Kerry Senior Football League which has been sponsored by Lee Strand since the mid 1980s is a competition that is traditionally played at the beginning of the year between the five member clubs.

West Kerry Junior Championship

The West Kerry Junior Football Championship is a Gaelic football competition established in 1990 between the B teams of clubs affiliated to the West Kerry division of the Gaelic Athletic Association. An Ghaeltacht top the roll of honour with 16 championships.

Roll of Honour

2022 - An Ghaeltacht 
2021 - Dingle
2020 - An Ghaeltacht 
2019 - An Ghaeltacht
2018 - Dingle
2017 - Dingle
2016 - Annascaul
2015 - An Ghaeltacht 
2014 - Dingle
2013 - An Ghaeltacht 
2012 - An Ghaeltacht 
2011 - Dingle 
2010 - Dingle
2009 - Castlegregory 
2008 - An Ghaeltacht 
2007 - An Ghaeltacht 
2006 - An Ghaeltacht 
2005 - Castlegregory 
2004 - Lios Póil
2003 - Annascaul 
2002 - Dingle
2001 - An Ghaeltacht 
2000 - An Ghaeltacht 
1999 - An Ghaeltacht 
1998 - Lios Póil
1997 - An Ghaeltacht 
1996 - Castlegregory 
1995 - Lios Póil
1994 - Blennerville 
1993 - An Ghaeltacht 
1992 - An Ghaeltacht 
1991 - An Ghaeltacht 
1990 - Castlegregory

All Stars
The West Kerry All Stars team comprises the best player in each position, regardless of club affiliation. The composition of the All Star teams are decided on the performance of individuals in the Moran's of Dingle West Kerry Championship.Compiled by a selection committee of sports journalists from local media & former players. The inaugural team was announced in 2018 and the awards have been sponsored since then by Quinn's Bar Ventry. There is also a Player of the Year award and a Young Player of the Year award. It is presented annually to the footballer who performed outstandingly in that year's West Kerry Championship.

2018

2019 

2020
 The 2020 All Stars were not held due to the COVID-19 pandemic.

2021

See also
East Kerry Senior Football Championship
North Kerry Senior Football Championship
Mid Kerry Senior Football Championship

References

We